Masters M55 javelin throw world record progression is the progression of world record improvements of the javelin throw M55 division of Masters athletics.  Records must be set in properly conducted, official competitions under the standing IAAF rules unless modified by World Masters Athletics.

The M55 division consists of male athletes who have reached the age of 55 but have not yet reached the age of 60, so exactly from their 55th birthday to the day before their 60th birthday. The M55 division throws a 700 g implement.

Key

References

Masters Athletics Javelin Throw list

Masters athletics world record progressions
Javelin